Pascal Yoadimnadji (April 8, 1950  – February 23, 2007) was a Chadian politician. He was Prime Minister of Chad from February 2005 to his death in February 2007.

Biography
Yoadimnadji was born in Béboto in the Logone Oriental Region of southern Chad, on April 8, 1950. He was a member of the Gor ethnic group, and was a lawyer.

He served as head of the National Electoral Commission from 1995 to 1997, during which time the 1996 presidential election was held. He was appointed as Minister of Mines, Energy and Oil on May 21, 1997, and subsequently he became Minister of Tourist Development in 1998 and Minister of the Environment and Water in 1999. He then served as President of the Constitutional Council from 1999 to 2004 and was appointed as Minister of Agriculture on July 23, 2004.

Yoadimnadji headed La Francophonie's observer mission for the January 2003 parliamentary election in Djibouti.

He became Prime Minister on February 3, 2005, when he was appointed by President Idriss Déby following the resignation of Moussa Faki. On August 24, 2005, Yoadimnadji announced that the government of Chad would remove all the accomplices of Chad's former leader, Hissène Habré, from official positions. He approved extending a state of emergency in November 2006 for six months in eastern provinces due to a rise in ethnic clashes that killed as many as 400 people. Yoadimnadji called for a mobilization of soldiers after the Darfur conflict spilled into Chad. The Los Angeles Times reported that "although he was a senior government figure, Yoadimnadji was not a major player in Chadian politics."

On February 21, 2007, Yoadimnadji suffered a heart attack and fell into a coma, and he was flown to France for medical treatment. He died of a brain hemorrhage on February 23 at a hospital in Paris. Seven days of mourning were declared for him in Chad, beginning on February 23. On February 26, he received a state funeral in N'Djamena, in which he was praised by Déby. His body was then given to his family for burial in Béboto. A school has been named after him.

References

1950 births
2007 deaths
Chadian lawyers
People from Logone Oriental Region
20th-century lawyers
Heads of government of Chad
Agriculture ministers of Chad
Energy ministers of Chad
Environment ministers of Chad
Mining ministers of Chad
Oil ministers of Chad
Tourism ministers of Chad
Water ministers of Chad